The Symphony No. 84 in E major, Hoboken I/84, is the third of the six Paris Symphonies (numbers 82–87) written by Joseph Haydn. It is sometimes known by the subtitle In nomine Domini.

Background 

The symphony was one of a series of six symphonies commissioned in 1784 by the Concert de la Loge Olympique, a popular concert subscription in Paris (hence the name for the series as a whole). Like the other Paris symphonies, Symphony no. 84 was written for the largest orchestral ensemble that Haydn had written for up until that time, including reinforced woodwind parts and a large string section. Unlike the other Paris symphonies (save No. 87), in No. 84 greater "prominence [is] given to woodwind instruments." Despite its number, the symphony was actually one of the last of the six Paris symphonies to be composed. It was completed in 1786.

Movements 
The work is in standard four movement form and scored for flute, two oboes, two bassoons, two horns, and strings.

Largo — Allegro
Andante,  in B major
Menuet e Trio, 
Finale: Vivace

The slow second movement is a hybrid between ternary and variation form.  The main theme is similar in shape to the introduction to the first movement.  After the theme is stated, there is a contrasting passage in the minor which is only loosely based melodically on the main theme.  Then two more strophic variations follow, the first lyrical and the second more grand.  The movement then segues to a cadenza passage that features the full wind band over pizzicato strings before the full tutti concludes the movement with one last statement of the theme.

See also 
List of symphonies by name

Notes

References
Bernard Harrison, Haydn: The "Paris" Symphonies (Cambridge University Press, 1998)
H. C. Robbins Landon, The Symphonies of Joseph Haydn (Universal Edition and Rockliff, 1955)
D. P. Schroeder, Haydn and the Enlightenment: the late symphonies and their audience (Oxford University Press, 1997)

External links 
 

Symphony 084
Compositions in E-flat major
1786 compositions